John Ganson (January 1, 1818 – September 28, 1874) was an American lawyer and politician who served one term as a U.S. Representative from New York from 1863 to 1865.

Biography
Born in Le Roy, New York, Ganson attended the public schools and Le Roy Academy. He  graduated from Harvard University in 1839 and subsequently studied law. He was admitted to the bar in 1846 and commenced practice in Canandaigua, New York. He moved to Buffalo the same year.

Political career 
He was a member of the New York State Senate (31st D.) in 1862 and 1863. Ganson was elected as a Democrat to the 38th United States Congress, holding office from March 4, 1863, to March 3, 1865. Afterwards he resumed the practice of law in Buffalo. Following the war, he was a director of a local railroad. He served as delegate to the 1864 Democratic National Convention.

Ganson was again a member of the State Senate in 1874.

Death 
He died in Buffalo on September 28, 1874, and was buried at the Forest Lawn Cemetery, Buffalo.

Sources

1818 births
1874 deaths
Democratic Party New York (state) state senators
People from Le Roy, New York
19th-century American railroad executives
Harvard University alumni
Politicians from Buffalo, New York
Burials at Forest Lawn Cemetery (Buffalo)
Democratic Party members of the United States House of Representatives from New York (state)
19th-century American politicians
Lawyers from Buffalo, New York
19th-century American lawyers